Wernigerode Hauptbahnhof is a railway station in the municipality of Wernigerode, located in the Harz district in Saxony-Anhalt, Germany.

It is a through station on the Magdeburg-Goslar line, and is also the terminus of the Harzquerbahn, housing its headquarters and engine sheds. It thus attracts many steam enthusiasts and visitors to the Brocken.

A bus station is sited to its south-east on Kleine Dammstraße, and a carpark to its north-west, on Feldstraße.

Just west of the station is a remarkable three-level junction. A crossroads between Ochsenteichstraße (B244) and Schlachthofstraße is underground, the mainline and narrow-gauge railways are at ground level, and above them crosses a bicycle and footbridge with a spiral at either end.

References

Railway stations in Saxony-Anhalt
Buildings and structures in Harz (district)